XEFRTM-AM is a radio station on 770 AM in Fresnillo, Zacatecas, Mexico. It is owned by GlobalMedia and is known as W Radio with programming from W Radio. The transmitter site is located southwest of Zacatecas City.

History
XEFRTM was awarded in the IFT-4 radio auction of 2017 and is one of three stations GlobalMedia companies obtained in the auction. The frequency had previously been occupied by XEIH-AM, which migrated to FM as XHIH-FM 103.3.

References

Radio stations in Zacatecas
Radio stations established in 2020
2020 establishments in Mexico